Peter Gow (November 20, 1818 – February 24, 1886) was an Ontario businessman and political figure. He was a member of the Legislative Assembly of Ontario from 1867 to 1876.

Background
He was born in Johnstone, Scotland in 1818, the son of a shoemaker, and came to Brockville in Canada West in 1842. He later moved to Guelph, where he built mills on the Speed River, operated a tannery and produced shoes. He served on the school board and the town council in Guelph; he became reeve in 1857 and served as mayor in 1866 and 1867. He married Mary Maxwell Smith, in 1857 and they had six children.

In 1874, he was elected as the first president of the Ontario Branch of the Royal Caledonian Curling Club.

Politics
In 1867, he was elected to represent Wellington South in the 1st Parliament of Ontario as a Liberal member; he was reelected in 1871 and 1875. In both those elections, the Conservative Party chose not to run a candidate and Gow was acclaimed. He served as Provincial Secretary and Registrar of Ontario from December 1871 to October 1872. During that time, the Mowat government made the decision to locate the Ontario Agricultural College in Guelph.

Cabinet positions

Later life
In 1876, he resigned due to health reasons and was appointed sheriff for Wellington County, continuing to serve until his death in Guelph in 1886.

References

External links

1818 births
1886 deaths
Immigrants to the Province of Canada
Mayors of Guelph
Members of the Executive Council of Ontario
Ontario Liberal Party MPPs
People from Brockville
People from Johnstone
Provincial Secretaries of Ontario
Scottish emigrants to pre-Confederation Ontario